This is the discography of Dianne Reeves, an American jazz singer.

Studio albums

Christmas albums

Soundtrack albums

Live albums

Compilation albums

Singles

Promotional singles

Guest appearances 

 1975: Best of Ronnie Laws
 1976: Yesterday's Dreams (Alphonso Johnson)
 1977: Comin' Through (Eddie Henderson); From Me to You (George Duke); Sky Islands (Caldera)
 1978: Black Forest (Luis Conte); Kinsman Dazz (Kinsman Dazz); Steamline (Lenny White)(background); Time and Chance (Caldera)
 1979: Splendor (Splendor)
 1981: Seduzir (Djavan)
 1981: Tender Togetherness (Stanely Turrentine)
 1984: Fiesta (Victor Feldman)
 1985: Ebony Rain (Mark Winkler); Magnetic (Steps Ahead); Streetshadows (David Diggs)
 1986: This Side Up (David Benoit)
 1988: Joy Rider (Wayne Shorter)
 1989: At Last (Lou Rawls); Ballads (Lou Rawls); Best of Feldman and the Generation Band (Victor Feldman's Generation Band); Straight to My Heart: The Music of Sting (Bob Belden Ensemble)
 1990: Nova Collection '90 (Various); Yule Struttin''' (Various)
 1991: Continuing the Legacy of Black Music... (Various); Free Play (Eduardo Del Barrio); Keys to Life (Ben Tankard)
 1992: Christmas Carols & Sacred Songs (Boys Choir of Harlem); Handel's Messiah: A Soulful Celebration (Various); Legendary Lou Rawls (Lou Rawls); Moonlight Love: Soft Sounds for a Summer Night (Various)
 1993: Journey (McCoy Tyner Big Band); Let Your Love Flow (Solomon Burke)(background); When the Time is Right (Javon Jackson)
 1994: Blue Note Now! (Various); For the Love of Music (Lionel Hampton); I've Known Rivers (Billy Childs); Shades of Blue (Bob Belden)
 1995: Esquire Jazz Collection: Crosstown Traffic (Various); Jazz to the World (Various); Rhythm & Blues Christmas [Cema] (Various); Today's Stars Sing Holiday Classics (Various)
 1996: Benny Carter Songbook (Benny Carter)
 1996: Bob Beldon Presents Strawberry Fields (Various); Doky Brothers, Vol. 2 (Niels Lan Doky & Chris Minh Doky); Never Ending Game, Vol. 1 (Dreadformation); New Groove: The Blue Note Remix Project, Vol. 1 (Various); Panasonic Village Jazz Festival 1996 (Various); Place of Hope (Various); Soulful Sounds of Christmas [One Way] (Various); Strawberry Fields (Bob Belden); World Christmas (Various)
 1997: 1997 Panasonic Village Jazz Festival (Various); Best of George Duke: The Elektra Years (George Duke)(background); Fiesta & More (Victor Feldman); Is Love Enough?(George Duke) (background); Last Time I Committed Suicide (Original Soundtrack); Monk on Monk (T.S. Monk); Sample This (Joe Sample); Sleep Warm (Various); Slow Jams: On the Jazz Tip, Vol. 1 (Various); Soul Control (Gerald Veasley); That Old Feeling (Original Soundtrack); Yule Be Boppin' (Various); Great Jazz Vocalists Sing Strayhorn & Ellington (Various); Ultimate Nina Simone (Nina Simone)
 1998 :Afro-Cuban Fantasy (Cabildo) (Poncho Sanchez); Blue Box, Vol. 2: Finest Jazz Vocalists (Various); Blue Note Salutes Motown (Various); Blue Note Years 1939–1999(Various); Chez Toots (Toots Thielemans); Colors of a Band (Peter Herbolzheimer); Minh Chris (Minh Doky); Seasons 4 U (Lou Rawls); Soulful Divas, Vol. 3: Softly with a Song (Various); Soulful Divas, Vol. 5: Ladies of Jazz N Soul (Various); Ultimate Divas [Box] (Various); We've Got What You Need (James Williams & ICU)
 1999: Afro Blue (Various); Art & Soul (Renee Rosnes); Beach Music Anthology, Vol. 2 (Various); Best Blue Note Album in the World Ever (Various); Billboard Top Contemporary Jazz (Various); Blue Movies: Scoring for the Studio (Various); Blue Note Years, Vol. 6: New Era 1975–1998 (Various); Blue Note Years, Vol. 7: Blue Note Now & Then (Various); Blue Valentines (Various); Down Here Below (Jeffery Smith); Edge (Lenny White); Jazznavour (Charles Aznavour); Just the Ticket (Original Soundtrack) (background); Live at the Blue Note: 75th Birthday Celebration (Chico & Von Freeman); Live in Swing City: Swingin with the Duke (Lincoln Center Jazz Orchestra & Wynton Marsalis); Manhattan Melodies (Eric Reed); Native Voices (Various); R 'N' Browne (Tom Browne); Tribute to Ellington (Daniel Barenboim)
 2000: 30 Years of Montreux Jazz Festival (Various); Anthology (Eddie Henderson) (background); Going Home: Tribute To Duke Ellington (Various); Love Affair: The Music of Ivan Lins (Jason Miles/Various); Never Gonna Give Up (Lorrich); Pure Cool (Various); Sci-Fi (Christian McBride); Smooth and Straight (Various); Smooth Grooves: Jazzy Soul, Vol. 2(Various); Yesterday, Today and Tomorrow (Rodney Whitaker)
 2001: Dear Louis (Nicholas Payton); Identity Crisis (Affirmation); Let's Get Lost: The Songs of Jimmy McHugh (Terence Blanchard); Phonography (DJ Smash); With a Little Help From My Friends (Renee Rosnes)
 2002: At His Best (Solomon Burke) (background); Café (Trio da Paz); I Heard It on NPR: Jazz for Blue Nights (Various); Incredible Solomon Burke at His Best (Solomon Burke)(background); Lenny White Collection (Lenny White); Pump It Up (Les McCann); Tom Browne Collection (Tom Browne)
 2003: I Heard It on NPR CD Box Set: Jazz for Blue Nights (Various); Midnight Music (Various); Wise Children (Tom Harrell)
 2004: Blue Note Plays the Beatles (Various); Colors of Latin Jazz: Música Romántica (Various): The Magic Hour (Wynton Marsalis)
 2006: The Phat Pack (Gordon Goodwin's Big Phat Band)
 2014: Map to the Treasure: Reimagining Laura Nyro'' (Billy Childs)

References

External links 

 Official website
 Dianne Reeves at AllMusic
 

Discographies of American artists
Jazz discographies